Lee & Man Paper Manufacturing Limited is a Hong Kong-listed Chinese private papermaking company engaged in the manufacturing of packaging paper, such as linerboard and containerboard, and wood pulp. It has paper production plants in Guangdong, Jiangsu and Jiangxi provinces, as well as in the city of Chongqing and in Vietnam. The company employs about 4,000 people. It was established in 1994 and listed on the Hong Kong Stock Exchange in 2003.

External links
Lee & Man Paper Manufacturing Limited

Companies listed on the Hong Kong Stock Exchange
Manufacturing companies of Hong Kong
Companies based in Dongguan
Manufacturing companies established in 1994
Pulp and paper companies of China
Privately held companies of China
Papermaking in China